Elena Bovina was the defending champion, but chose not to participate that year.
 Amélie Mauresmo won in the final against Venus Williams 6-7(6–8), 6–0, 3–0, retired due to straining an abdominal muscle.

Seeds

  Venus Williams (final)
  Amélie Mauresmo (champion)
  Daniela Hantuchová (second round)
  Jelena Dokić (semifinals)
  Magdalena Maleeva (first round)
  Eleni Daniilidou (second round)
  Anna Pistolesi (quarterfinals)
  Conchita Martínez (withdrew)
  Elena Likhovtseva (withdrew)
  Tatiana Panova (first round)

Main draw

Finals

Top half

Bottom half

References

External links
 Draw

JandS Cup - Singles
Warsaw Open